Erik Hoffmann (born 22 August 1981) is a Namibian professional road bicycle racer. He was born in Windhoek. He moved to University of Stuttgart, Germany in 2001 to study Electrical Engineering. During 2002 - 2004, he was part of Team Stuttgardia Stuttgart and ever since has been active in professional bicycle racing.

Palmarès 

 2003
  All African Games, Road, Abuja, Nigeria
 2004
 1st, Nedbank Cycle Classic (NAM)
 2005
 3rd, Overall, Stuttgart-Strassburg
 2006
 1st, Günzach Allgäu
 1st, Donnersbergkreis
 1st, GP Baden-Baden
 1st, Ludwigsburg-Eglosheim
 2007
  National Road Championships
 Circuito Montañés
 1st, Stage 1, El Astillero
 3rd, Stage 6, Santo Toribio
 , B World Championships, Cape Town
 2008
 2nd, Stage 3, Tour de Taiwan, Baguashan
 Tour of East Java
 3rd, Stage 3, Batu
 2nd, Stage 5, Surabaya
 1st, Backnang-Waldrems
 2nd, Overall, Tour de Korea
 2nd, Stage 1, Yamaga circuit
 3rd, Stage 8, Yangyang
 21st Olympic Games Beijing
2009
 , African Championships, Road Race, Namibia
 , African Championships, Individual Time Trial, Namibia

External links

http://www.erik-hoffmann.com/

Cyclists at the 2008 Summer Olympics
Cyclists at the 2010 Commonwealth Games
Commonwealth Games competitors for Namibia
Namibian male cyclists
White Namibian people
Namibian people of German descent
Olympic cyclists of Namibia
Sportspeople from Windhoek
1981 births
Living people